Santa María Volcano is a large active volcano in the western highlands of Guatemala, in the Quetzaltenango Department near the city of Quetzaltenango.

The volcano was known as Gagxanul in the local Kʼicheʼ language, which means "Naked Volcano or Mountain", before the 16th century Spanish conquest of the region.

The VEI-6 eruption of Santa María Volcano in 1902 was one of the three largest eruptions of the 20th century, after the 1912 Novarupta and 1991 Mount Pinatubo eruptions. It is also one of the five biggest eruptions of the past 200 (and most likely 300) years.

Geological history
Santa María Volcano is part of the Sierra Madre range of volcanoes, which extends along the western edge of Guatemala, separated from the Pacific Ocean by a broad plain. The volcanoes are formed by the subduction of the Cocos Plate under the Caribbean Plate, which led to the formation of the Central America Volcanic Arc.

Eruptions at Santa María are estimated to have begun about 103 ka. Following the cone-building eruptions, activity seems to have changed to a pattern of long periods of repose followed by the emission of small lava flows from vents on the mountain.

1902 eruption

The first eruption of Santa María in recorded history occurred in October 1902.  Before 1902 the volcano had been dormant for at least 500 years and possibly several thousand years, but its awakening was clearly indicated by a seismic swarm in the region starting in January 1902, which included  a major earthquake in April 1902. The eruption began on 24 October, and the largest explosions occurred over the following two days, ejecting an estimated  of magma. The eruption was one of the largest of the 20th century, only slightly less in magnitude to that of Mount Pinatubo in 1991. The eruption had a Volcanic Explosivity Index (VEI) of 6, thus being 'Colossal'.

The first evidence of the eruption was a sprinkling of sand on Quezaltenango.

Because of the lack of recorded eruptive activity at Santa María, local people did not recognise the preceding seismicity as warning signs of an eruption.  Estimates are that 6,000 people died as a result of the eruption.

In the middle of the disaster, Quetzaltenango regional authorities had to take charge, as the central government was focused on the celebration of the "Fiestas Minervalias", the largest propaganda festival of president Manuel Estrada Cabrera' regime; furthermore, the central government was so focused on the festival that it tried to minimize the impact of the eruption and went as far as tell the citizens that it was not in Guatemalan soil, but in México.  Furthermore, the official government response was to tell Quetzaltenango authorities that there were no funds for the recovery, as those were already spent to help after the April 1902 earthquake. Under such circumstances, Quetzaltenango regional authorities declared that all the West zone agricultural harvest was ruined, and forecasted famine due to food shortages; likewise, cattle were dying and there were meat shortages as well. They were allowed by the central government to import flour free of taxes for the next few months.

For the native people the eruption consequences were catastrophic: they not only lost relatives, friends, homes and harvest, but they were also forced to work free of charge in the recovery while "criollo" landlords were compensated for the loss with lands that were confiscated from native communities in San Miguel Uspantán Quiché Department, Panam in Suchitepéquez Department and in Sololá Department.

1902 eruption sequence of events
 24 October: 5:00 pm: At San Felipe a sound was heard, similar to the roar of a waterfall, for five minutes, coming from the volcano; but the mist surrounding the volcano did not allow any direct observation of what was happening.
 24 October: 6:00 pm: Cinders and ashes started falling over Quetzaltenango
 24 October: 7:00 pm: Witnesses recall seeing lightning and a strong fiery red light coming from the volcano, and noise similar of that of an industrial furnace.
 24 October: 8:00 pm: From San Felipe one could see a giant plume of black ash with numerous whirlwinds crossed by thousands of lightning bolts and curved lines of red light.
 26 October: 12:00 am: The volcano calmed down.
 26 October: 3:00 pm: Another eruption, but this time it was a white plume that came out, which was likely composed of water vapor.

Image gallery

Santiaguito

The 1902 eruption was followed by 20 years of dormancy. New eruptions began in 1922, with the extrusion of a lava dome complex in the crater left by the 1902 eruption. The lava dome complex, named Santiaguito, is still active today with over 1 km3 of lava erupted so far. The lava dome complex has four main domes: El Caliente, La Mitad, El Monje and El Brujo. The currently active vent is El Caliente.

The dome growth has been both endogenous and exogenous. The former implies dome interior expansion to accommodate new lava and the latter refers to superficial piling up of lava. Activity has been concentrated at several different vents, and Santiaguito now has the appearance of several overlapping domes. At the beginning of dome growth the composition was dacite, identical to the composition of the Santa Maria eruption. By 1990 the composition had shifted to a less evolved andesite. It has been proposed that this is due to a stratified magma chamber beneath the volcano.

The early (pre-1990) exogenous volcanism has consisted of lava spines and lava flows. Nowadays, only lava flows are erupted. All the volcanic activity is cyclic with 10+ year cyclic timescales between periods of high volcanism with high extrusion rates and low volcanism with low extrusion rates. The latest with high extrusion rate was in 2011–2015 with the emplacement of more than four new lava flows. Frequent small eruptions and pyroclastic flows have been ongoing throughout dome growth.

Although most of Santiaguito's eruptive activity has been relatively gentle, occasional larger explosions have occurred. In 1929 part of the dome collapsed, generating pyroclastic flows which killed anywhere from several hundred up to 5,000 people. Occasional rockfalls have generated smaller pyroclastic flows, and vertical eruptions of ash to heights of a few kilometres above the dome are common. Santiaguito is now a tourist attraction, as minor eruptions occur with regularity and can be observed by visitors from the summit of Santa Maria.

Volcanic hazards at Santa María

The areas to the south of Santa María are considerably affected by volcanic activity at Santiaguito. Currently, the most common volcanic hazards at Santa María are lahars, which frequently occur in the rainy season due to heavy rainfall on loose volcanic deposits. Lahars are particularly large and frequent during periods of high volcanism at Santiaguito. The town of El Palmar,  from Santiaguito, has been destroyed twice by lahars from Santiaguito forcing the town to be moved to the present Nuevo El Palmar, and infrastructure such as roads and bridges have been repeatedly damaged. Lahar deposits from Santiaguito have affected rivers all the way downstream to the Pacific Ocean.

Near constant lava flows occur from Santiaguito, and can reach up to 4 km from the vent. Lava flow activity occurs in cycles, with the longest lava flows occurring during times of high volcanic activity. Much shorter lava flows occur during the longer periods of low volcanic activity. These lava flows flow only a short distance from the vent before collapsing. The magma at Santiaguito is rich in silica and is thus highly viscous. The lava flows are slow moving and mostly cause property damage, although in the past catastrophic pyroclastic flows have been triggered from lava flows, which have extended several kilometers towards the west.

One hazard which could be devastating is the collapse of Santa María itself. However, this is thought to be unlikely in the short term.

In light of the threat it poses to nearby populations, Santa María has been designated a Decade Volcano, identifying it as a target for particular study by volcanologists to mitigate any future natural disasters at the volcano.

See also
 List of volcanic eruptions by death toll
 List of volcanoes in Guatemala
 Timeline of volcanism on Earth

References
Notes

Bibliography

 
 
 Bunzendahl, E.; Bluth, G. J.; Rose, W. I.; Reif, S. L.; Matias, O. (2001), Developing a Long-term Hazard Mitigation Plan for Consequent Volcanic Sedimentation Hazards at Santiaguito Dome Complex, Guatemala, American Geophysical Union, Fall Meeting 2001, abstract #V41A-0974
 Harris, A. J.; Flynn, L. P.; Rose, W. I.; Matias, O.; Cornejo, J. (2002), The extrusion of lava dome and block lava flow units at Santiaguito, 1922–2002, American Geophysical Union, Fall Meeting 2002, abstract #V12A-1399

External links
 
 
 Santa María: Pictures and recent activity, from VolcanoWorld
 Santa María Decade Volcano information
 Account of a visit to the Santiaguito Volcano Observatory at the Magma Cum Laude blog

Quetzaltenango Department
Sierra Madre de Chiapas
Active volcanoes
Decade Volcanoes
Stratovolcanoes of Guatemala
Subduction volcanoes
VEI-6 volcanoes
Mountains of Guatemala
Volcano
1902 natural disasters
20th-century volcanic events
Volcanic eruptions in Guatemala
Pleistocene stratovolcanoes
Holocene stratovolcanoes